The Council of Christian Churches in Madagascar (FFKM) (French: Conseil chrétien des Eglises à Madagascar; Malagasy: Fiombonan'ny Fiangonana Kristiana eto Madagasikara) is an inter-church organization in Madagascar founded in 1980. It comprises the four main religious denominations in the country: the Roman Catholic Church (EKAR), the Church of Jesus Christ in Madagascar (FJKM), the Malagasy Episcopal Church (Eklesia Episkopaly Malagasy/Anglican Church), and the Malagasy Lutheran Church (FLM). The FFKM is headquartered in Antananarivo, and its member denominations represent more than 10 million members. The FFKM currently celebrates its 40th anniversary.

Membership 
To become a member church, a denomination "must confess the Lord Jesus Christ as God and only Saviour according to the scriptures."

Leadership 
The Council is led by a President and a Secretary-General. The presidency alternates annually between the four church leaders.

See also 
 World Council of Churches

References 

1980 establishments in Africa
Christianity in Madagascar
Christian organizations based in Africa
Interfaith organizations
Members of the World Council of Churches
Religious organisations based in Madagascar
Christian organizations established in 1980